The softskin smooth-head (Rouleina attrita), also called the softskin slickhead, is a species of fish in the family Alepocephalidae.

Its specific name is from the Latin attrīta ("bruised, worn away"), presumably referring to the mutilated or decomposed state of the type specimens.

Description

Its upper jaw reaches to behind the eye, and it has a lateral line of 43–48 photophores. It has 43–46 vertebrae. Its scales are deciduous and its skin contains small fluid-filled compartments. Its eyes contain convexiclivate temporal foveae containing densely packed ganglia.

Habitat

It has been recorded in all non-polar seas.

Behaviour

Its testes are ribbon-like, in convoluted folds but never in discrete lobes.

References

Platytroctidae
Fish described in 1888
Taxa named by Léon Vaillant